Daniel Mace (September 5, 1811 – July 26, 1867) was a U.S. Representative from Indiana.

Born in Pickaway County, Ohio, Mace attended the public schools.
He studied law. He was admitted to the bar in 1835 and practiced in Lafayette, Indiana. He served as member of the state house of representatives in 1836.
He served as clerk of the state house of representatives in 1837 and United States attorney for Indiana 1849–1853.

Mace was elected as a Democrat to the Thirty-second and Thirty-third Congresses (March 4, 1851 – March 3, 1855). He was re-elected as an Indiana People's Party candidate to the Thirty-fourth Congress (March 4, 1855 – March 3, 1857).
He served as chairman of the Committee on the Post Office and Post Roads (Thirty-fourth Congress).
He resumed the practice of law. He was the Postmaster of LaFayette from September 22, 1866, until his death in LaFayette, July 26, 1867.  He was interred in Greenbush Cemetery.

References

1811 births
1867 deaths
People from Pickaway County, Ohio
Democratic Party members of the United States House of Representatives from Indiana
Indiana Populists
People's Party members of the United States House of Representatives
United States Attorneys for the District of Indiana
19th-century American politicians